Thomas Lilti (born 30 May 1976) is a French family doctor, screenwriter and film director. He is best known for his three movies series about the medical field: “Hippocrate” (Hippocrates: Diary of a French Doctor) in 2014, “Médecin de Campagne” (Rural physicians) in 2016 and “Première année” (First Year) in 2018.

Filmography

References

External links

1976 births
Living people
French film directors
French male screenwriters
French screenwriters
French-language film directors